John Proctor Fifield  (October 5, 1871 – November 27, 1939) was a Major League Baseball pitcher.

External links

1871 births
1939 deaths
Major League Baseball pitchers
Baseball players from New Hampshire
Philadelphia Phillies players
Washington Senators (1891–1899) players
19th-century baseball players
Little Rock Travelers players
Detroit Tigers (Western League) players
Minneapolis Millers (baseball) players
Rome Romans players
Syracuse Stars (minor league baseball) players
Binghamton Bingoes players
Wilkes-Barre Barons (baseball) players
People from Enfield, New Hampshire